Will Schwartz is an American pop musician. He is a member of the bands Imperial Teen, whose debut album Seasick was released in 1996, and hey willpower.

Of the "queer alt-rockers Imperial Teen," one New York Times reviewer wrote that "though every song on the album is good, the best are the ones about homosexuality ("Butch"), Kurt Cobain ("You're One") and complete nonsense ("Imperial Teen")".

In July 2003, Schwartz and Tomo Yasuda created a dance pop project called hey willpower. hey willpower released the EP hey willpower in 2005, and the LP PDA in 2006.

Imperial Teen's latest album, Now We Are Timeless, was released in 2019. Schwartz remains active with both bands.

References

External links
Imperial Teen official website
Imperial Teen MySpace
hey willpower Official Website
hey willpower MySpace

Living people
Year of birth missing (living people)
American rock guitarists
American male guitarists
American LGBT musicians